The LGBT slang terms lesbian until graduation (LUG), gay until graduation (GUG), and bisexual until graduation (BUG) are used to describe women primarily of high school or college age who are assumed to be experimenting with or adopting a temporary lesbian or bisexual identity, but who will ultimately adopt a  heterosexual identity.

Usage 
In a 1999 article in the Seattle Weekly, A. Davis related her experimentation with same-sex relationships, and how as a result, she experienced hostility from lesbian friends who pressured her to identify as a bisexual, including one friend who urged her to do so as a political statement, despite the fact that Davis identifies as a heterosexual who merely experimented with women for a brief period.  Davis said that women who experienced same-sex relationships are more attuned to LGBT issues, and more likely to oppose discrimination.  She also said that if the same degree of acceptance were extended to men who experimented with homosexuality, it would promote greater acceptance of the LGBT community.

See also 

 Biphobia
 Class S (genre)
 Mixed-orientation marriage
 Questioning

References

External links

Sohn, Amy (February 10, 2003). "Bi For Now". New York Magazine.
 Lewin, Tamar (March 17, 2011). "Study Undercuts View of College as a Place of Same-Sex Experimentation". The New York Times. 
 Lewin, Tamar (September 16, 2005). "Nationwide Survey Includes Data on Teenage Sex Habits". The New York Times.
 "More women experimenting with bisexuality". MSNBC/Associated Press.
 Clark, Jessica (May 30, 2007). "Bisexual healing". Metro Times. Detroit, Michigan.
 "The Vagina Dialogues" . Phoenix New Times.
 Baumgardner, Jennifer (October 9, 2007). "Lesbian After Marriage". The Advocate. 
 Donaldson James, Susan (August 16, 2007). "Young Women Defy Labels in Intimacy With Both Sexes". ABC News.

LGBT slang
Pejorative terms for women
Lesbian culture
Biphobia
Lesbophobia